is a Japanese former professional footballer who played as a midfielder or defender. He played for the Japan national team. he the current manager J3 League club of Fukushima United.

Club career
Hattori was born in Shizuoka on 23 September 1973. After he dropped out from Tokai University, he joined Júbilo Iwata in 1994. He played in many defensive positions. He was a central player in golden era in club history. The club won the champions at J1 League three times (1999, 1999, 2002). The club also won 1998 J.League Cup and 2003 Emperor's Cup. In Asia, the club won the 1998–99 Asian Club Championship and came second place at 1999–2000 and 2000–01 Asian Club Championship. He played the club until 2006. Toward end of his career, he played for Tokyo Verdy (2007–09), Gainare Tottori (2010–11) and FC Gifu (2012–13). He retired end of 2013 season.

International career
In July 1996, Hattori was selected Japan U23 national team for 1996 Summer Olympics. He played in all three matches. Although Japan won two matches, Japan lost at First round. At this time, Japan won Brazil in first game. It was known as "Miracle of Miami" (マイアミの奇跡) in Japan.

On 11 September 1996, Hattori debuted for Japan national team against Uzbekistan. He was selected Japan for 1996 Asian Cup and 1998 World Cup, but he did not play in the match both competition. After 1998 World Cup, he came to be well selected for Japan by new manager Philippe Troussier. He played at 1999 Copa América, 2000 Asian Cup, 2001 Confederations Cup and 2002 World Cup. At 2000 Asian Cup, he played in all matches and Japan won the champions. At 2001 Confederations Cup, Japan won 2nd place. After 2002 World Cup, he played as regular player under new manager Zico. He was also selected Japan for 2003 Confederations Cup, but he did not play in the match. He played 44 games and scored 2 goals for Japan until 2003.

Career statistics

Club

International

Scores and results list Japan's goal tally first, score column indicates score after each Hattori goal.

Honors
 Júbilo Iwata
 AFC Champions League: 1999
 Asian Super Cup: 1999
 J1 League: 1997, 1999, 2002
 Emperor's Cup: 2003
 J.League Cup: 1998
 Japanese Super Cup: 2000, 2003, 2004

Japan
 FIFA Confederations Cup runner-up: 2001
 AFC Asian Cup: 2000

Individual
 J.League Best Eleven: 2001

References

External links
 
 
 Japan National Football Team Database
 

1973 births
Living people
People from Shizuoka (city)
Association football people from Shizuoka Prefecture
Tokai University alumni
Japanese footballers
Japan international footballers
J1 League players
J2 League players
Japan Football League players
Júbilo Iwata players
Tokyo Verdy players
Gainare Tottori players
FC Gifu players
1996 AFC Asian Cup players
1998 FIFA World Cup players
1999 Copa América players
2000 AFC Asian Cup players
2001 FIFA Confederations Cup players
2002 FIFA World Cup players
2003 FIFA Confederations Cup players
AFC Asian Cup-winning players
Footballers at the 1996 Summer Olympics
Olympic footballers of Japan
Association football midfielders
J3 League managers
Fukushima United FC managers